Wilh. Steinberg is a piano manufacturer in Eisenberg, Germany.

The company was founded by the Geyer family in 1877 in Eisenberg, Germany. After the reunification of Germany the company merged with several other East German piano companies. In 2013, Wilh. Steinberg was bought by Parsons Music Group, a company based in Hong Kong.

With Parsons investment, Wilh. Steinberg was able to develop and expand their range of pianos.

Current Grand Piano Models

Signature Series 
These pianos are made in Germany with actions by Renner and keyboards by Kluge. Grand cabinets are supplied by Parsons Music in China.

Performance Series 
Performance series models are entirely made by Parsons Music in China using Thüringer designs.

WS Series

Current Upright Piano Models

Signature Series 
These pianos are made in Germany with actions by Renner and keyboards by Kluge. Cabinets for the verticals are made by Thüringer Pianoforte in its own facilities;

Performance Series 
Performance series models are entirely made by Parsons Music in China using Thüringer designs.

AT Series

AT-K Series

References

External links 

 Official homepage

Companies based in Thuringia
Piano manufacturing companies of Germany